The Westinghouse J30, initially known as the Westinghouse 19XB, was a turbojet engine developed by Westinghouse Electric Corporation. It was the first American-designed turbojet to run, and only the second axial-flow turbojet to run outside Germany (after the British Metropolitan-Vickers F.2).

A simple and robust unit with six-stage compressor, annular combustor, and single-stage turbine, it initially gave 1,200 pounds of thrust but improved to 1,600 in production versions. Its first flight was under a FG Corsair in January 1944. It was developed into the smaller J32, and the successful Westinghouse J34, an enlarged version which produced 3,000 pounds of thrust.

Variants
19APrototypes and initial production, boost engines
19BIncreased mass flow version delivering  at 18,000 rpm at sea level, added gearbox to allow engine to be a prime driver
19XB-2BCompany designation for WE-20.
XJ30-WE-7  for Northrop X-4
XJ30-WE-8 originally designated J43
XJ30-WE-9  for Northrop X-4
J30-WE-20 production engines delivering  thrust, Internal model 19XB-2B

Applications
 Convair XF-92
 McDonnell FH Phantom
 Northrop XP-79
 Northrop X-4 Bantam

Specifications (Westinghouse 19A)

See also

Notes

References

External links

Minijets website Westinghouse 19

1940s turbojet engines
J30